WUPW (channel 36) is a television station in Toledo, Ohio, United States, affiliated with the Fox network. It is owned by American Spirit Media, which maintains a joint sales agreement (JSA) with Tegna Inc., owner of CBS affiliate WTOL (channel 11), for the provision of certain services. Both stations share studios on North Summit Street in downtown Toledo, while WUPW's transmitter is located on Corduroy Road in Oregon, Ohio.

History

The station went on-air September 22, 1985 as an independent with an analog signal on UHF channel 36. It originally had the call sign WDMA-TV but was changed to its present-day calls before its first sign-on. Originally, WUPW was owned by a consortium of local investors and private companies. The station's original studios were located at Four SeaGate on North Summit Street in Downtown Toledo. It became a charter Fox affiliate on October 6, 1986. It was sold to Atlanta-based Ellis Communications in 1993. Three years later, that company was sold to a group led by the Retirement Systems of Alabama who merged with AFLAC's broadcasting group to form Raycom Media.

In 1998, Raycom announced that it would acquire Malrite Communications Group, the owner of NBC affiliate WNWO-TV (channel 24). In order to complete Raycom's acquisition of Malrite (which would be finalized in 1999), WUPW was spun off to Sunrise Television due to Federal Communications Commission (FCC) rules at the time prohibiting common ownership of two stations in the same market. WNWO was longer-established and Raycom opted to keep that station over WUPW. Sunrise Television was absorbed into LIN TV in May 2002. Raycom sold WNWO to Barrington Broadcasting in 2006 after its merger with the Liberty Corporation gave it ownership of CBS affiliate WTOL.

Until 2001, WUPW was the only over-the-air television station in the area to air cartoons weekday afternoons as the local WB affiliate, WT05, was cable exclusive. In early-June 2007, WUPW, along with three other LIN TV-owned Fox affiliates switched their websites over to Fox Interactive Media's "MyFox" platform, becoming the first Fox stations not owned and operated by the network to adopt the site. WUPW later dropped MyFox in favor of a new site platform co-developed by LIN and Fox, spun off as the independent company EndPlay.

The tower was built by Stainless Steel Tower of Pennsylvania. The top section has a  aerial mast with a side mount dipole antenna for the transmission of analog television programs. It was completed in 1985 and is the property of LIN TV.

On January 11, 2012, it was reported that LIN Media would sell WUPW to Charlotte-based American Spirit Media (owned by Thomas B. Henson) for $22 million. As part of the acquisition, WUPW entered into a joint sales agreement (SSA) with Raycom Media's WTOL; three other American Spirit Media stations are located in markets with a Raycom-owned "Big Three" network affiliated station, and the American Spirit Media stations in all three of those markets are also operated by Raycom through JSAs. The acquisition and joint sales agreement was finalized by the two stations on April 20, 2012. All remaining WUPW staff now operates from WTOL's facility, but WUPW's management and sales departments remain separate from their WTOL counterparts.

On June 25, 2018, Atlanta-based Gray Television announced it had reached an agreement with Raycom to merge their respective broadcasting assets (consisting of Raycom's 63 existing owned-and/or-operated television stations, and Gray's 93 television stations) under Gray's corporate umbrella, in a cash-and-stock merger transaction valued at $3.6 billion. Because Gray owned WTVG (which the company acquired in 2014 from SJL Broadcasting), and since WTOL and WTVG rank among the four highest-rated stations in the Toledo market in total day viewership, Gray announced that it would retain WTVG and sell WTOL to Tegna Inc. in order to comply with FCC ownership rules; the JSA involving WUPW would be included in the sale of WTOL. The deal was completed on January 2, 2019.

Carriage disputes
On October 2, 2008, Time Warner Cable's contract to carry WUPW expired and the cable system lost the right to carry the station's programming as a result. On October 29, the station and Time Warner Cable reached a contract for carrying both analog and high definition signals. However, customers in Erie County (except the immediate Sandusky area) and Huron County no longer receive WUPW on local cable. This area is included in Time Warner Cable's Northeast Ohio region and is served accordingly by Cleveland's WJW.

On December 12, 2012 at 5 p.m., Buckeye CableSystem ceased broadcasting of WUPW, due to a dispute between the cable system, American Spirit and Raycom Media. The dispute was over the increase in rates to carry the station in light of its low ratings and American Spirit's purchase of WUPW, in which they gave control of the station to WTOL. Since that date, CableSystem viewers saw a notice about the dispute in WUPW's channel position explaining the dispute. WUPW would return to Buckeye's lineup on January 21, 2013.

Charter Communications/Fox restrictions
WUPW was dropped in 2012 from Charter Communications for southeastern Michigan subscribers due to new Fox contractual restrictions disallowing duplicative carriage of out-of-market Fox affiliates to protect the network's ratings and local station revenue; in this case Fox's owned-and-operated Detroit station WJBK (channel 2) serves as the affiliate in that market. WUPW could air in the market, but only if most programming, including all Fox programming, except for local newscasts, infomercials and syndicated programming not claimed by any Detroit station was blacked out, so Charter (which has also had major issues in Michigan with WJBK's carriage outside of Detroit over the years) chose to drop the station completely. This issue has also affected many other markets and Fox affiliates, and 'market exclusivity' clauses are now common in new network agreements overall.

2017–18 American Spirit Media/DirecTV and AT&T U-verse dispute
WUPW's parent company, American Spirit Media, failed to renew its retransmission contract with DirecTV/AT&T U-verse upon its expiration on August 31, 2017. After a three-week extension period passed with both parties failing to agree on a new contract, American Spirit Media withdrew permission for DirecTV/AT&T U-verse to retransmit the signals of its stations as of 11:59 p.m. EDT on September 21. The dispute lasted for four months before a resolution was reached on January 30, 2018.

This dispute was particularly frustrating for viewers in the Toledo market, as it coincided with the beginning of the 2017–18 television season, the Major League Baseball postseason, the National Football League regular season, and the college football regular season. Viewers in WUPW's market were unable through DirecTV/AT&T U-verse to watch Fox network coverage of Detroit Lions games, the 2017 ALCS, the 2017 World Series, and numerous college football games, including several Ohio State football games

The blackout also included Fox's first ever broadcast of "The Game" against Michigan, which has defined the rivalry between the two states, since the 1835–36 Toledo War that affected the region's boundaries itself.

Programming
Syndicated programs broadcast by WUPW as of fall of 2021 include Live with Kelly and Ryan (moved from WTVG), Maury, The Steve Wilkos Show, The People's Court, Karamo, and TMZ on TV . WUPW airs regional and national sports programming from Fox Sports. Local teams that appear on WUPW include Detroit Lions preseason (syndicated by WJBK) and regular season games (from NFL on Fox).

News operation

, WTOL produces 18½ hours of locally produced newscasts each week for WUPW (with 3½ hours each weekday and a half-hour each on Saturdays and Sundays). As the SSA partner of WTOL, the station may also simulcast long-form severe weather coverage in the event that a tornado warning is issued for any county in its northwestern Ohio viewing area.

On January 28, 1996, WUPW began to air a weeknight prime time newscast produced by CBS affiliate WTOL, Fox 36 News at 10, which was discontinued on July 31, 2000 with the debut of a new independently produced newscast, Fox Toledo News at 10. The broadcast was extended to an hour on August 6, 2001 with a five-minute "Fastcast" review of news, weather, and sports ending at 11 while also expanding to seven nights a week. The news operation quickly established itself as critically acclaimed, with their newscasts winning several Lower Great Lakes Emmy Awards and citations from the Associated Press of Ohio for overall excellence.

On January 5, 2004, WUPW launched Fox Toledo News First at 4 on weekdays with the nightly 10 o'clock show renamed as First at 10 and an updated set and new graphics. In November 2006, this station took over third-place ranking in viewership in the November ratings period, a position previously held by WNWO. In September 2010, the station began to offer limited morning news and weather cut-ins in a two-hour programming block of syndicated sitcoms known as The Morning Zone 

September 24, 2007 saw the expansion of First at 4 to an hour. This newscast was canceled on January 11, 2010 and replaced with a show that airs weeknights at 6:30 against national news programs seen on the big three networks. Its weather radar is currently known as "StormTrack Doppler".  Throughout its existence, WUPW's news department has won many awards. The channel maintains partnerships with the Toledo Free Press, Bowling Green Sentinel-Tribune, Findlay Living Magazine, Wauseon Fulton County Expositor, and at one time, on WNWT AM 1520.

In early January 2012, long time news anchor Laura Emerson left the station and moved to Kentucky to join NBC affiliate WPSD. Laura Emerson had been with WUPW for over 16 years and had been with the station since its very first newscast in 1996. Her final broadcast at WUPW was on January 6, 2012. She has since returned to Toledo on WNWO-TV.

As a result of its sale to American Spirit Media, WUPW's in-house news department was shut down and WTOL took over production of the station's newscasts on April 23, 2012; which included 6:30 and 10:00 p.m. newscasts aired by WUPW beginning on April 23, 2012, and a morning newscast added on June 11, 2012, along with a shift to high definition newscasts.  Former anchor and executive producer Shaun Hegarty did not remain with the station after the merger, as he moved over to WTVG as an investigative reporter. The two stations also introduced a shared website, ToledoNewsNow.com.

Technical information

Subchannels
The station's digital signal is multiplexed:

Analog-to-digital conversion
On June 12, 2009, WUPW turned off its analog signal permanently. The station's digital signal remained at channel 46 following the digital transition. Digital tuners display its virtual channel as 36 using PSIP. In early 2010, the FCC received an application from WUPW to nearly double its power from 110 to 200 kilowatts.

WUPW's high definition-ready 8VSB digital transmitter was first turned on for broadcasting in 2003. The transmitter is a liquid-cooled solid state system and quickly became known as a very reliable signal as other stations in the Toledo area struggled with the Inductive output tube type of transmitter during the birth of digital television in northwest Ohio. The WUPW transmitter has a great deal of redundancy: sixteen amplifiers and hot standby back-up digital exciters. It also has its own on-board computer system to watch over critical systems. The WUPW transmitter site has an emergency diesel generator to keep the station on-the-air even if a total loss of electrical power were to occur in the city.

References

External links

Fox network affiliates
Bounce TV affiliates
Ion Mystery affiliates
Court TV affiliates
Defy TV affiliates
Scripps News affiliates
UPW
Tegna Inc.
Television channels and stations established in 1985
1985 establishments in Ohio